Gyromitra ambigua is an ascomycete fungus species of the genus Gyromitra, and related to the false morel G. esculenta. It belongs to the Pezizales order. The species is found in North America, where it produces fruit bodies (mushrooms) that grow on the ground. The edibility of the fruit bodies is not known with certainty, and it is not recommended for consumption.

See also
 Gyromitrin, a toxic chemical found in Gyromitra fungi
 Morchella, the true morels

References

Discinaceae
Fungi described in 1881
Fungi of North America